The Johor–Singapore Causeway is a  causeway consisting of a combined railway and motorway bridge that links the city of Johor Bahru in Malaysia across the Straits of Johor to the district and town of Woodlands in Singapore. It was the only land connection between the two from 1928 until 1998, when the Tuas Second Link opened.

The causeway also serves as a water pipeline between the two countries.

It is one of the busiest border crossings in the world, with 350,000 travellers daily. Many Malaysians continue to live in Malaysia and commute daily (with either  public or private motorised transportation) to Singapore, enduring extremely long journey times with extreme heavy traffic congestion on weekdays. The border is handled by immigration authorities of both countries at the Southern Integrated Gateway (Malaysia) and Woodlands Checkpoint (Singapore). Since 26 March 2022, both countries have permitted pedestrians to walk along the Causeway by foot,  but this is not common; pedestrian walking is generally limited to instances of standstill vehicular congestion on the Causeway which prevents passengers from boarding regular-hour cross-border public buses after clearing immigration.

History

Construction and opening
In the late 19th century, Singapore was transformed into a major international trading port and was a steamship coaling station. At the turn of the 20th century, British Malaya was transformed into a major producer and exporter of raw materials such as tin, rubber, gambier, and pepper for international markets. The connection to Singapore from Johor was through a ferry link.  Railways across the peninsula, and in Singapore from the ferry point to Tank Road in the south of Singapore completed the trade transport network within British Malaya. From June 1909 onward, goods were transported on wagon-ferry, while passengers were transported on passenger ferries (3 ferries from 1912 onward, 2 ferries before 1912). The wagon-ferry could accommodate 6 wagons at a time, while the passenger ferries had a capacity of about 160 each. As international trade demands grew, it was necessary to operate the ferry link round-the-clock in 1911 to bring the commodities from British Malaya into Singapore to be transshipped. Additional ferry steamers were constructed, however they soon were overloaded. The passenger steamers often had to exceed its designed limits, carrying "as many as 250 passengers". Additionally, the increasing costs of the maintaining the ferries were a concern on the long-term viability of the ferries. The annual expenditure in 1912 was estimated to be 53,750 Straits dollars (£1.8 million in 2000).

In 1917, Federated Malay States (FMS) Director of Public Works, W. Eyre Kenny's proposal to build a rubble causeway gain support among the Federal Council of the FMS.His suggestion was to have the foundation to be laid in the soft "white and pink clays" at the proposed site, have an opening span for ships to be allowed through the bridge, and have the rubble sourced from the quarries at Pulau Ubin and Bukit Timah as there were ample granite being sold at reasonable prices. Among the alternatives to the Causeway design were a bridge or upgrading the wagon-ferries and train ferries. The bridge proposal wasn't followed through because the Straits was too deep, going at 70 feet at some points and foundations would be lacking. An opening span would be required, and the bridge would require significant maintenance. The train ferries to replace the wagon-ferries would be too expensive as well.

The causeway proposal was accepted by FMS Chief Secretary and Straits Settlements Colonial Secretary, Edward Lewis Brockman, and Straits Settlements Governor and FMS High Commissioner, Sir Arthur Henderson Young. In 1917, Governor Young cited the six-fold increase in railway receipts in Singapore from 82,000 Straits dollars (£2.7 million in 2000) in 1912 to 480,000 Straits dollars (£11.8 million in 2000) in 1916 as an evidence to the rapid growth of the railway traffic, and thus the FMS Railway Administration could not defer any longer on the improvement works required. The British government had consultant engineers Messrs Coode, Fitzmaurice, Wilson & Mitchell of Westminster to prepare plans for the eventual Causeway. The plans were presented to the FMS, Straits Settlements and Johore governments in 1918. The plan was approved in 1919 after the sharing of the costs of constructing the Causeway, was negotiated between the three governments.

By the engineering standards of its time, the Causeway was a technically challenging project. It was also one of the largest engineering projects in Malaya then. Many considerations were factored for the finalised design. Tidal studies were carried out prior to the construction and design features were incorporated in consideration to the structure itself, its surroundings, and continued ship passage through the Straits. The orientation also factored in the current railway terminations on both shores. The design would be 3,465 feet long, 60 feet wide, sufficient enough for two lines of metre-gauge railway tracks and a 26 foot wide roadway, with space reserved for laying of water mains at a later date. Floodgates were incorporated at the lock to control the tides.

The construction contract was awarded to Messrs Topham, Jones & Railton Ltd of London on 30 June 1919. The engineering firm had completed major works at the dockyards and harbour in Singapore, and had necessary work capacity and experience in the area available. The contract allowed the firm a period of 5 years and 3 months to complete the construction. Construction started in August 1919, starting with the lock at Johore's bank. Sequence of construction would allow minimal disruption to existing shipping or ferrying services.

On 24 April 1920, a ceremony was held to mark the laying of the foundation stone. The Johore Sultan, Sultan Ibrahim, the newly appointed Governor of Straits Settlements and High Commissioner of the FMS, Sir Laurence Guillemard, his wife among other invited guests graced the ceremony on board Sea Belle, a sea yacht, in the middle of the Straits. The ceremony commenced with prayers and Governor Guillemard was invited to pull a silken cord which activated machinery to empty a load of rubble from a barge into the water. Sirens from the surrounding ships then greeted the now emptied barge. A second barge of rubble was emptied as well with air tolak bala and air doa selamat being poured into the Straits. A gun salute of five rounds fired from Bukit Timbalan marked the end of the ceremony.

British Malaya was impacted by the Depression of 1920–21 as she was a primary source for many commodities internationally. The constructions process was thus under intense public scrutiny and criticism. Additionally, the British Admiralty would like to have the locks be widened and deepened to accommodate British warships. However, it was found to be difficult to engineer and was very costly. The FMS and Straits Settlements government thus had considered dropping the project.

In January 1923, the lock was open for local sea craft. On 1 October, the partially completed Causeway was officially opened to passenger traffic. The Causeway was officially completed in 1924 when the finishing touches to the lock was done. With an estimated cost 17 million Straits dollars (£277 million in 2000), over 2,300 staff and labourers were employed to during the course of the construction. An opening ceremony was conducted in Johore on 28 June 1924. The Johore Sultan and Governor Guillemard graced the ceremony which a ribbon cutting ceremony was held. A special holiday was declared in Johore for more of the public to take part in the festivities. The opening marked a new era which uninterrupted communications between Singapore and Bangkok now exists. The administration of the Causeway was formalised in 1925 with the formation of the Johore Causeway Control Committee. Under FMSR, the committee was given full autonomy to oversee the efficient management and maintenance of the Causeway.

World War II and post-war period

As the Japanese invasion of Malaya drew to a close, under the command of Lieutenant-General Arthur Percival, the Allied forces began retreating from their positions in Johore, crossing the Causeway in the early hours of 31 January 1942. The Causeway was blown up with two explosions.  The first wrecked the lock's lift-bridge, while the second caused a 70 feet wide gap in the Causeway and severed the water-carrying pipelines as well. Though this action had caused the Japanese to be delayed, the Japanese constructed a girder bridge over the gap allowing their troops to march into Singapore.

The bridge remained in its war-torn state until the return of the British after the surrender of the Imperial Japanese forces. The girder bridge was replaced with two Bailey bridge extensions in February 1946, with the rubble of the demolished lift bridge cleared and the railway tracks re-laid. Reconstruction plans of lock channel and lift bridge were looked at in the late 1940s, but were subsequently shelved due to the demand for water passage through the Causeway wasn't substantial enough to justify the reconstruction costs.

During the Malayan Emergency of 1948 to 1960, as a strategic conduit between Singapore and Malaya, travellers were subjected to stringent security measures to impede the movement of enemy combatants and weapons between Singapore and Malaya. The checks, together with attacks on railway lines further aggravated the traffic congestion on the Causeway. Additionally, the Causeway would be further congested during public holidays and festive seasons.

Independence and border control

The Causeway first became an international border when the Federation of Malaya achieved independence on 31 August 1957. Plans were made to introduce immigration controls at the Causeway, however, a system of strict identity card checks was implemented instead. The Causeway became an internal state border when the Federation of Malaya, Singapore, Sabah and Sarawak merged to form Malaysia on 16 September 1963.

On 22 July 1964, as part of a curfew after racial riots in Singapore, the Causeway was closed to travellers without police permission. It was reopened during non-curfew hours the following day and normal traffic had resumed by 26 July.

After Singapore's separation from Malaysia on 9 August 1965, the Causeway became the border connector between the two countries. Immigration checkpoints were built on both sides, with passport controls implemented on the Singaporean side from June 1967 and on the Malaysian side from September.

To support the ever-increasing trade and foot traffic on the Causeway, both the Malaysian and Singapore governments carried out works to widen the Causeway multiple times as well as to improve checkpoint facilities. Singapore replaced its checkpoint in 1999, followed by Malaysia in 2008. A second border crossing bridge, the Malaysia–Singapore Second Link between Tanjung Kupang and Tuas, was completed in 1998.

In response to the COVID-19 pandemic, Malaysia instituted a nationwide movement control order on 18 March 2020 and closed the country's borders, affecting hundreds of thousands of cross-border commuters between Malaysia and Singapore. However, the flow of cargo, goods and food supplies continued. On 29 November 2021, authorities of both countries eased their land border controls, and began to allow a restricted daily flow of 2,880 residents to travel between the countries by the Causeway under a vaccinated travel lane scheme via designated bus services. However as the infections of the SARS-CoV-2 Omicron variant spiked, the number of travellers allowed was halved between 23 December 2021 and 20 January 2022. The quota of daily passengers was increased to 3,420 on 14 March 2022. From 1 April 2022, the quota was lifted with no restrictions imposed on the mode of travel across the land connections.

Border checkpoints

Southern Integrated Gateway

The Southern Integrated Gateway consists of the Sultan Iskandar Building and the Johor Bahru Sentral railway station (JB Sentral).

Sultan Iskandar Building is the customs, immigration and quarantine (CIQ) complex handling road traffic and pedestrians. It was officially opened by the Malaysian Prime Minister, Abdullah Badawi on 1 December 2008 and went into full operations on 16 December 2008. The old Tanjung Puteri CIQ complex was subsequently demolished. As the new CIQ complex was located 1 km further inland from the old checkpoint, as well as the lack of a dedicated pedestrian walkway on the new access road, pedestrians are officially no longer allowed to cross the Causeway on foot, though it is tolerated during severe traffic congestion.

JB Sentral railway station is the main railway station of Johor Bahru since 21 October 2010, replacing the old Johor Bahru railway station. JB Sentral also serves as the southbound exit immigration and customs checkpoint for rail passengers heading toward Singapore.

Woodlands Checkpoint

The new Woodlands Checkpoint, built partially on reclaimed land, was opened in 1999 to accommodate the increasing traffic flow and the soot which had enveloped the old customs complex over the years. The old customs complex, built in the early 1970s, at the junction between Woodlands Road and Woodlands Centre Road closed after the new checkpoint was opened in July 1999, although the motorcycle lane remained opened in the morning until 2001, and it had been reopened on 1 March 2008 for goods vehicles only.

The new checkpoint complex also houses the Woodlands Train Checkpoint, opened on 1 August 1998, as the Singapore railway border clearance facility, which was previously co-located with Malaysian immigration and customs at Tanjong Pagar railway station. The relocation to Woodlands caused disputes between the two countries, which was resolved in 2010. On 1 July 2011, Woodlands Train Checkpoint replaced Tanjong Pagar railway station as Singapore's inter-city railway station. Northbound rail passengers pass through co-located border clearance for both countries at Woodlands Train Checkpoint before boarding the train to Malaysia. Southbound rail passengers clear Malaysian exit controls at JB Sentral, and Singapore immigration and customs on arrival at Woodlands Train Checkpoint.

Attempts to have the causeway replaced
As far back as 1966, there were several calls by the Malaysians to remove the Causeway. In 1966, in the Johor state legislative council, the speaker said that the Causeway was "more a hindrance than anything else" while a port should be built close to Johor Bahru to rejuvenate the city's economy. The state of Johor currently already has developed ports including Pasir Gudang and Tanjong Pelapas.

The second demand came in year 1986 when Israeli President Chaim Herzog visited Singapore. At that time, the Singapore Government was criticised by Malaysian politicians and the press for allowing his visit.

Under the former Mahathir administration, the Malaysian government scheduled to build a new customs, immigration and quarantine complex on a hilltop near the Johor Bahru railway station. A bridge was planned to link the new customs complex with the city square. The project was named Southern Integrated Gateway (Gerbang Selatan Bersepadu) by the government. The project was awarded to a construction company, Gerbang Perdana. During the construction, one of the two underpass channels located at the end of the old customs complex had been blocked. Roads exiting from the old customs complex have been diverted. The  design envisages a re-direction of traffic flow to the new customs complex after the completion of the proposed new bridge to Singapore. The old customs complex will be torn down once the new customs complex begins operation. All this while, no agreement had been reached with the Singapore Government on replacing the causeway with a proposed new bridge.

The proposals on replacing the old causeway with a new bridge has resulted in a political rift between the two countries since the early 2000s. The Malaysian government envisioned that disagreement by Singapore to participate in the project would result in a crooked bridge above Malaysian waters with half the causeway remaining on the Singapore side. However, Singapore has hinted that it might agree to a bridge if its air force is allowed to use part of Johor's airspace. Malaysia refused the offer and negotiation is said to be still ongoing.

In January 2006, Malaysia unilaterally announced that it is going ahead to build the new bridge on the Malaysian side, now referred to as scenic bridge. The construction of the new scenic bridge on Malaysian side officially began on 10 March 2006, when the piling works of this bridge was completed, but on 12 April 2006, construction was halted and scrapped by Mahathir's successor, Abdullah Ahmad Badawi, with growing complications in both negotiation (the conditions set by Singapore were strongly opposed by the people of Malaysia on grounds of national sovereignty) and legal matters with Singapore.

In 2006, Badawi has said that "in [the] future, there won't be just one or two bridges between Malaysia and Singapore." That same year however, the Sultan of Johor called for the demolition of the link, reasoning that the Causeway is undermining the state economy as it is causing a brain drain.

Tolls and VEP charges
Vehicles have to pay toll charges at both sides of the causeway. The toll plaza at the Malaysian side is operated by PLUS Expressway Berhad. In Singapore, VEP charges apply to cars and motorcycles that have utilised the 10-VEP free days.

The toll charges are updated from 1 August 2014.

Malaysian toll charges

Note: Toll charges can only be paid with the Touch 'n Go card. Cash payment is not accepted.

Singapore toll charges

Note: Toll charges are only paid through Autopass Card (Malaysian registered vehicles only), EZ-Link, NETS CashCard or NETS FlashPay. An additional administrative fee of S$10 will be payable for cash payments.

Additional Road charges 
For foreign-registered cars and motorcycles entering Singapore

Singapore VEP charges for foreign-registered cars and motorcycles
 Passenger cars: S$35 (or RM112) per day (as of 1 August 2014)
 Motorcycles: S$4 (or RM13) per day
Singapore Reciprocal Road Charge (RRC) for foreign-registered cars

Passenger cars only: S$6.40 (or RM112) per entry

For foreign-registered vehicles entering Malaysia

Malaysia VEP charges for foreign-registered private vehicles
 RM 20.00 Road Charge ( Motorcycles, Commercial, Government and Diplomat vehicles are exempted)

See also
 AH2
 Malaysia–Singapore border
 Øresund Bridge – between Denmark and Sweden

References

Others
 New Ten VEP-Free Days Scheme And Shorter VEP Operating Hours, news release, Land Transport Authority, Singapore, 15 May 2005.

Works cited

Further reading 
 Ilsa Sharp, (2005), SNP:Editions, The Journey – Singapore's Land Transport Story.

External links

 Google Maps link showing the Causeway, with Johor Bahru at top and Singapore below. The Malaysia–Singapore boundary is located where the road surface changes colour midway.
 Border crossing - Singapore-Malaysia
 History of Singapore Immigration

Bridges in Singapore
Causeways
Expressways and highways in Johor
Expressways in Singapore
International bridges
Malaysia–Singapore border crossings
North–South Expressway (Malaysia)
South Johor Economic Region
Woodlands, Singapore
Toll bridges in Malaysia
Bridges completed in 1924
20th-century architecture in Singapore